, formerly , was the third daughter of Emperor Shōwa and Empress Kōjun. She was an elder sister to the former Emperor of Japan, Emperor Akihito. She married Toshimichi Takatsukasa on 21 May 1950. As a result, she gave up her imperial title and left the Japanese Imperial Family, as required by law.

Biography
Princess Taka was born at the Tokyo Imperial Palace. As was the practice of the time, she was not raised by her biological parents, but by a succession of court ladies at a separate palace built for her and her younger sisters in the Marunouchi district of Tokyo. She graduated from the Gakushuin Peer's School in March 1948, and spent a year in the household of former Chamberlain of Japan Saburo Hyakutake learning skills to be a bride.

On 20 May 1950, she married Toshimichi Takatsukasa, the eldest son of ex-Duke and guji of Meiji Shrine, Nobusuke Takatsukasa. The marriage received much publicity as it was the first marriage of a member of the imperial family to a commoner. Though legally commoners following the Second World War, the Takatsukasa family had been part of the ancient court nobility (kuge), with the peerage title of duke in the pre-war kazoku peerage (and would therefore have been considered a traditional family for an Imperial marriage). Nobusuke Takatsukasa was the first cousin of Empress Teimei through his father Takatsukasa Hiromichi, making his son and daughter-in-law second cousins once removed (as the groom's grandfather and the bride's great-grandfather were siblings).

On 28 January 1966, Toshimichi Takatsukasa was found dead of carbon monoxide poisoning at the apartment of his mistress, Michiko Maeda, a Ginza nightclub hostess, giving rise to widely speculative rumors in the Japanese press about his alleged double suicide. After her husband's death, Kazuko's misfortunes continued, as seven months later, on 22 August 1966, a knife-wielding intruder broke into her home in the middle of the night and assaulted her, causing injuries to her right and left hands and resulting in hospitalization for one week. A shocked Emperor Shōwa ordered that she relocate to within the Akasaka Estate in Akasaka, Tokyo, where she lived until her death of heart failure at the age of 59, months after her father died.

From 1974 to 1988 she served as chief priestess (saishu) of Ise Shrine, taking over the role from her great-aunt Fusako Kitashirakawa.

The Takatsukasas had no children, but adopted their nephew Naotake Matsudaira (born 1945) of the former Ogyu Matsudaira clan, as their heir. Formerly President of NEC Telecommunications Systems, he has most recently been chief priest of Ise Shrines from 2007 to 2017.

Ancestry

Gallery

References

Sources
 Takie Sugiyama Lebra, Above the Clouds: Status Culture of the Modern Japanese Nobility (Berkeley: University of California Press, 1992).

External links

Time Magazine Feb 6 1950 on wedding

Japanese princesses
Takatsukasa family
Japanese Shintoists
1929 births
1989 deaths
Grand Cordons (Imperial Family) of the Order of the Precious Crown
20th-century Japanese women
20th-century Japanese people
Japanese priestesses
People from Tokyo